Kotov may refer to:
Kotov, a Russian surname
Kotov (village), a village (khutor) in Rostov Oblast, Russia
8246 Kotov, a main-belt asteroid
Kotov syndrome, a chess term